Coleophora tanaceti is a moth of the family Coleophoridae. It is found from Spain, north to Fennoscandia, east to the Baltic region, south to Italy and Bulgaria. It has also been recorded from the Near East.

External links
Swedish Moths
Fauna Europaea

tanaceti
Moths of Europe
Moths of Asia
Moths described in 1865